Snooker has seen corruption allegations since its inception as a professional sport. Professional player and commentator Willie Thorne considered match-fixing endemic to snooker, noting that he himself was offered money to throw a match. The earliest known case of corruption in the game involved Joe Davis, pioneer of the professional sport and winner of the first 15 world championships, who is believed to have "carried" weaker opponents in multi-session matches to maximise gate revenue.

Players have sometimes been coerced into fixing results. Thai players in particular have been targeted by cartels. James Wattana once received a death threat as part of a match-fixing attempt, while Thanawat Tirapongpaiboon was the victim of a firebomb attack on his Rotherham home after the governing body opened an investigation into him and fellow Thai player Passakorn Suwannawat.

Match-fixing is difficult to prove. Only four arrests have taken place in the sport's history—Silvino Francisco, Stephen Lee and Scottish practice partners Stephen Maguire and Jamie Burnett—but no criminal prosecution has ever been brought. The only players the World Professional Billiards and Snooker Association have successfully prosecuted for match-fixing are Lee, Leo Fernandez, Yu Delu, Cao Yupeng, David John, Thanawat Tirapongpaiboon and amateur player John Sutton. Lee's 12-year-ban, the longest ever handed down in the sport, will run until October 2024. Yu's ban of 10 years and 9 months will run until February 2029. Four other players—Quinten Hann, John Higgins, Joe Jogia, and Jamie Jones—have served bans on match-fixing related charges.

Between October 2022 and January 2023, amid the biggest match-fixing investigation in the sport's history, the WPBSA suspended ten Chinese players—Bai Langning, Chang Bingyu, Chen Zifan, Li Hang, Liang Wenbo, Lu Ning, Yan Bingtao, Zhang Jiankang, Zhao Jianbo, and Zhao Xintong—from competing in or attending all World Snooker Tour events. In January 2023, the WPBSA brought match-fixing charges against all ten players. An independent disciplinary tribunal will begin proceedings on 24 April 2023. The players involved will remain suspended throughout the disciplinary process, meaning that they will miss all remaining tournaments in the 2022–23 snooker season, including the 2023 World Snooker Championship.

Players investigated for match-fixing.

Notes

References

Match-fixing
Snooker players investigated, List of